The 1981 Eastern 8 men's basketball tournament was held in Pittsburgh, Pennsylvania at the Civic Arena from March 3-7, 1981 (first round games were held at campus sites). Pittsburgh defeated Duquesne 64-60 to win their first tournament championship. Lenny McMillan of Pittsburgh was named the Most Outstanding Player of the tournament.

Bracket

External links
| Atlantic 10 Men's Basketball Tournament History

Atlantic 10 men's basketball tournament
Tournament
Eastern 8 men's basketball tournament
Eastern 8 men's basketball tournament